The 1972 Stockholm Open was a men's tennis tournament played on hard courts and part of the 1972 Commercial Union Assurance Grand Prix and took place at the Kungliga tennishallen in Stockholm, Sweden. It was the fourth edition of the tournament and was held from 4 November through 10 November 1972. First-seeded Stan Smith won the singles title.

Finals

Singles

 Stan Smith defeated  Tom Okker, 6–4, 6–3

Doubles

 Tom Okker /  Marty Riessen defeated  Roy Emerson /  Colin Dibley, 7–5, 7–6

See also
 1972 Swedish Pro Tennis Championships
 1972 Swedish Open

References

External links
  
  
 Association of Tennis Professionals (ATP) tournament profile

Stockholm Open
Stockholm Open
1972 Grand Prix (tennis)
Stock
Stockholm Open
1970s in Stockholm